Enger Church is a parish church of the Church of Norway in Søndre Land Municipality in Innlandet county, Norway. It is located in the village of Enger. It is one of the churches for the Søndre Land parish which is part of the Hadeland og Land prosti (deanery) in the Diocese of Hamar. The white, wooden church was built in a long church design in 1875 using plans drawn up by the architect Herman Frang. The church seats about 200 people.

History
Planning for a new church in the southern part of Søndre Land began in the 1870s. Herman Frang was hired to design the new church. It was to be a wooden long church with a western tower. There was a choir on the eastern end of the nave and the choir was flanked by sacristies. The church was completed and consecrated in 1875. The church was restored in 1950.

See also
List of churches in Hamar

References

Søndre Land
Churches in Innlandet
Long churches in Norway
Wooden churches in Norway
19th-century Church of Norway church buildings
Churches completed in 1875
1875 establishments in Norway